Washington has 9 Executive seats, all elected at large.  In 2008, all 9 positions were up for reelection. , this was the last set of statewide elections in Washington in which any Republicans won by double digits.

Offices and Candidates

Governor

Lt. Governor
Brad Owen was the incumbent and has held this position since 1996.

Secretary of State
Sam Reed, who held this position since 2000, was reelected.

State Treasurer
Mike Murphy (D) retired.

State Auditor
Brian Sonntag has held this position since 1993.

Attorney General

Polling

General election

Commissioner of Public Lands

Polling

General election

Superintendent of Public Instruction

Polling

General election

Teresa (Terry) Bergeson (cw) (NP)
John Patterson Blair (NP)
David Blomstrom (cw) (NP)
Randy Dorn (cw) (NP)
Enid Duncan (NP)
Donald Hansler (NP)

Insurance Commissioner
John R. Adams (cw) (R)
Curtis Fackler (cw) (NP)
Mike Kreidler (cw) (D)

External links
Election results – Washington Secretary of State
Candidates who have filed

Executives